The Dr. George Grierson Award (Devnagari: डॉ जॉर्ज ग्रियर्सन पुरस्कार) is a literary honor in India. It is conferred annually by Central Hindi Directorate, (Kendriya Hindi Sansthan), Ministry of Human Resource Development on writers of outstanding works in Hindi Literature. It is also a Hindi Sevi Samman and is given to number of Hindi experts for playing their important role in promoting the Hindi language abroad. It is awarded by the President Of India.

The award named after the linguist Dr. George Abraham Grierson was established by Kendriya Hindi Sansthan in 1989. The award carries Rs five lakh each, a citation and a shawl.

Award recipients

References 

Indian literary awards
Awards established in 1994
1994 establishments in India